The Kent Army Cadet Force (Kent ACF) is the county cadet force for Kent and Medway which operates as part of the Army Cadet Force.  Since 2014, the county has been part of Headquarters South East, and is divided into four companies (one entitled a squadron for the Royal Engineers).

Background 
In 1863, along with the formation of the Volunteer Force, the first government sanctioned cadet groups were allowed to be formed.  These groups would mostly be formed in connection with existing volunteer companies and battalions.  Following the Territorial and Reserve Forces Act 1907 which organised the former Volunteer Force into a coherent organisation, known as the Territorial Force (TF), the cadets were expanded.  Each company consisted of no less than 30 cadets, and four of these companies formed a "Cadet Battalion", the predecessors to the modern "Cadet County".

Unlike their modern successors, the first cadet battalions were administered by their local County Territorial Force Associations, and rarely ever came under an "army command".  However, following changes to the organisation of the Cadets, in 1923 all cadet forces were taken under complete control of the County Associations.

Below is a list of the cadet battalions which had been formed in Kent during the reorganisation of the TF and into 1939:

 Kent Public Secondary Schools Cadet Battalion
 Kent Fortress Royal Engineers 1st Cadet Battalion
 Kent Fortress Royal Engineers 2nd Cadet Battalion
 1st Volunteer Cadet Corps Battalion, East Kent Regiment (The Buffs)
 1st Cadet Battalion, The Queen's Own Royal West Kent Regiment
 2nd Cadet Battalion, The Queen's Own Royal West Kent Regiment

The first mention of the Kent Army Cadet Force was in 1964 in the London Gazette.  The supplement for 9 October 1964 states the restoration of the former commander of the county to the Territorial Army, but does not provide an appointment date.  A further mention is made in the 15th March 1963 supplement showing an officer commissioned from the county.

Under the Army 2020 programme, the 2nd (South East) Infantry Brigade was merged with 145th (South) Brigade to form the new 11th Infantry Brigade and Headquarters South East on 1 April 2014.  Following these changes, the county left the control of 2nd (South East) Brigade and joined 11th Infantry Brigade as part of Headquarters South East.

As of December 2021, each Army Cadet Force county reports to their local brigade deputy commander, or in the case of independent regional headquarters the commander.  However, for administrative duties each cadet county reports to Commander Cadets, who is a senior 1* Brigadier part of Headquarters, Regional Command.

Organisation 
As of December 2021, the Kent Army Cadet Force consists of appx. 850 cadets and 200 adult volunteers in 35 detachments spread throughout the county of Kent.  Each Army Cadet Force 'county' is in-fact a battalion, and each 'detachment' equivalent to that of a platoon.

The organisation of the county in 2021 was as follows:

 County Headquarters, at Yeomanry House, Maidstone
 Kent Army Cadet Force County Training Team

ACF Mission 
The Army Cadet Force is a national, voluntary, uniformed youth organisation. It is sponsored by the British Army but not part of it and neither the cadets nor the adult volunteer leaders are subject to military call-up.  They offer a broad range of challenging adventurous and educational activities, some of them on a military theme. Their aim is to inspire young people to achieve success in life and develop in them the qualities of a good citizen.

The ACF can be compared to their counterparts in the Junior Reserve Officers' Training Corps (USA), Hong Kong Adventure Corps, and Canadian Army Cadets, amongst others.

See also 

 List of Army Cadet Force units
 Combined Cadet Force

Footnotes

Notes

Citations

References 

 

Military units and formations in Kent
Military units and formations in Canterbury
Military units and formations in Dover
Army Cadet Force counties